Claire Parker is a female former rower who competed for England.

Rowing career
Parker was part of the double sculls with Diane Prince, that won the national title rowing for a Birmingham University and Pengwern composite, at the 1986 National Championships. This led to her representing England and winning a bronze medal in the doubles sculls with Diana Prince, at the 1986 Commonwealth Games in Edinburgh, Scotland.

She represented Great Britain in the 1989 World Rowing Championships and won the National title with Helen Mangan in both the double sculls and lightweight doubles.

In 1991 she was part of the double scull with Tonia Williams that won the national title rowing for the NCRA at the 1991 National Championships and afterwards she competed in the double sculls with Tonia Williams at the 1991 World Rowing Championships.

References

English female rowers
Commonwealth Games medallists in rowing
Commonwealth Games bronze medallists for England
Rowers at the 1986 Commonwealth Games
Medallists at the 1986 Commonwealth Games